2007 in Korea may refer to:
2007 in North Korea
2007 in South Korea